Clay Township, Ohio, may refer to:

Clay Township, Auglaize County, Ohio
Clay Township, Gallia County, Ohio
Clay Township, Highland County, Ohio
Clay Township, Knox County, Ohio
Clay Township, Montgomery County, Ohio
Clay Township, Muskingum County, Ohio
Clay Township, Ottawa County, Ohio
Clay Township, Scioto County, Ohio
Clay Township, Tuscarawas County, Ohio

Ohio township disambiguation pages